Mehmet Mehdi Eker is a Turkish politician who served as the Minister of Food, Agriculture and Livestock of Turkey from 2005 until 2015. He was elected a Member of Parliament for the electoral district of Diyarbakır for Democratic People's Party in 2002. He was re-elected in 2007 and 2011 for the Justice and Development Party (AKP). He was again elected as an MP in 2018.

A veterinarian and agro-economist he had a career as a civil servant in the ministry of agriculture before entering politics at the age of 46.

As minister of Agriculture he has had to deal with issues including:
 The bird flu epidemic of 2005, in which he made a statement that it was safe to eat cooked chicken and then famously refused to do so on television.
 Adjusting food control regulations to comply with EU norms, including recategorising pork and horse meat as suitable for human consumption.

References

1956 births
Living people
Government ministers of Turkey
Turkish Kurdish politicians
Justice and Development Party (Turkey) politicians
Recipients of the Order of the Cross of Terra Mariana, 3rd Class
Deputies of Diyarbakır
Members of the 24th Parliament of Turkey
Members of the 23rd Parliament of Turkey
Members of the 22nd Parliament of Turkey
Members of the 26th Parliament of Turkey
Members of the 60th government of Turkey